Manazel Sazmani (also Romanized as Manāzel Sāzmānī) is a village in Dasht-e Lali Rural District, in the Central District of Lali County, Khuzestan Province, Iran. At the 2006 census, its population was 114, in 25 families.

References 

Populated places in Lali County